The rank insignia of the Italian Air Force are worn  on jackets and mantels sleeves. 


Rank structure
40px|rightWarning:  The table below shows a simple literal translation of the Italian Air Force military ranks into English language,
DOES NOT represent a military ranks comparisons among NATO armed forces as officially stated by the - STANAG 2116.

Officers 

Notes:
1 The rank of "generale" (general) is assigned to the only air force officer promoted as marshal of the defense staff.

2 The rank of "generale di squadra aerea con incarichi speciali" (air squadron general with special assignments) is assigned to the air force officer promoted as marshal of the air force staff and/or as secretary of defense.

Non-commissioned officers and ratings 

Notes:
1 The function of "luogotenente" (sub-lieutenant) is not a rank but a position attributed only to NCO's with the rank of "primo maresciallo" (first marshal) with at least 15 years of permanence in it.

2 No rank insignia, airmen just wears category or specialty badge.

Enlisted ranks introduced in 2018

References

Bibliography
 Decreto legislativo 15 marzo 2010 n.66
 NATO – STANAG 2116 ed. 6, 25 February 2010

See also 
 Italian Army ranks
 Italian Navy ranks
 Military ranks of the Arm of Carabineers

Italian Air Force
Military insignia
Military ranks of Italy
Air force ranks